Jemal Tassew Bushra (born 27 April 1989) is an Ethiopian professional footballer who plays as a goalkeeper for Fasil Kenema and the Ethiopia national football team.

Career
Jemal began his career with Awassa City. In 2010, he joined Dedebit, and as of season 2012/13 he plays in Ethiopian Coffee. In 2010, he was awarded as Ethiopian Premier League Player of the Year.

In August 2018 Jamal signed with Fasil Kenama S.C.

International career
Jemal was in the squad that played 2010 CECAFA Cup. He debuted for Ethiopia in a match against Kenya, and played 3 games on that tournament. In 2012, he collected 2 more caps, against Sudan, and Niger.

Jemal was sent off in the 35th minute of Ethiopia's opening game of the 2013 Africa Cup of Nations against Zambia.

References

External links
 

1989 births
Living people
Ethiopian footballers
Ethiopia international footballers
2013 Africa Cup of Nations players
2014 African Nations Championship players
Ethiopia A' international footballers
People from Awasa
Association football goalkeepers
Sportspeople from Southern Nations, Nationalities, and Peoples' Region
Ethiopian Coffee S.C. players
Defence Force S.C. players
Dire Dawa City S.C. players
Fasil Kenema S.C. players
Wolkite City F.C. players
Adama City F.C. players
2021 Africa Cup of Nations players